The 1955 Texas Longhorns football team represented the University of Texas at Austin during the 1955 college football season.

Schedule

References

Texas
Texas Longhorns football seasons
Texas Longhorns football